Decatur Street is a street in the French Quarter neighborhood of New Orleans, Louisiana, USA that runs parallel to the Mississippi River. Decatur was formerly known as "Levee Street" or Rue de la Levée, as it was originally the location of the levee.  In 1870, when the river had altered its course, it was renamed "Decatur Street" in honor of the naval hero Stephen Decatur Jr.

Decatur begins at Canal Street (the corresponding street up-river of Canal Street is Magazine), runs across the French Quarter , and terminates at St. Ferdinand Street in the Faubourg Marigny neighborhood. The most famous sights on Decatur Street are Jackson Square and nearby Café du Monde.

For about a century, upper Decatur Street (the portion closer to Canal Street) had many businesses catering to sailors visiting the port of New Orleans. In the late 20th century, it was redeveloped and became more upscale, with establishments such as the House of Blues. In the late 20th century, lower Decatur Street became a center of local punk and goth subculture. It contains various bars and musical venues and is not far from Faubourg Marigny's Frenchmen Street venues.  The Palm Court Cafe is a famous traditional jazz venue located on Decatur Street.

See also

 List of streets of New Orleans

References

Streets in New Orleans